Eduardo Zone (born 24 July 1953) is an Argentine equestrian. He competed in two events at the 1984 Summer Olympics.

References

External links
 

1953 births
Living people
Argentine male equestrians
Olympic equestrians of Argentina
Equestrians at the 1984 Summer Olympics
Place of birth missing (living people)